Asatiani is a Georgian surname that may refer to:

 Kakhi Asatiani (1947–2002), Soviet footballer and manager
 Lado Asatiani (1917–1943), Soviet poet
 Maia Asatiani (born 1976), Georgian TV host
 Malkhaz Asatiani (born 1981), Georgian footballer
 Mikheil Asatiani (1882–1938), Georgian psychiatrist
 Nugzar Asatiani (1937–1992), Soviet fencer

Georgian-language surnames